The Battle of Kunlun Pass was a series of conflicts between the Imperial Japanese Army and the Chinese forces surrounding Kunlun Pass, a key strategic position in Guangxi province. The Japanese forces planned to cut off Chinese supply lines linking to French Indochina, but the Chinese forces managed to fight off the attacks.

The battle
The Imperial Japanese Army launched a major offensive into Guangxi province with the intention of eliminating the Chinese supply route through French-controlled Vietnam.  The elite Japanese 5th Division was given the task of spearheading the Japanese offensive. After occupying Nanning in November 1939, the Japanese captured the key point of Kunlun pass and were poised to attack the Chinese forces that protected Chungking, the wartime capital.

Realizing that inaction would result in being cut off, General Bai Chongxi, himself a native of Guangxi, asked the Nationalist Government for reinforcements. Chiang Kai-shek in turn, dispatched the 5th Corps from Hunan province to fight the Japanese.

The 5th Corps was the most elite unit in the NRA, and it is also the only Chinese unit that had tanks and armored vehicles. Its soldiers were combat-hardened veterans from previous engagements against Japanese forces, and as a result, morale was high. General Du Yuming, commander of the 5th Corps, dispatched two divisions to attack the Japanese-held Kunlun Pass. The New 22nd Divisions attack ended up cutting off Japanese reinforcements from the rear and also resulted in the death of the Japanese commander, Major General Masao Nakamura.

The Japanese reacted immediately by sending in the elite unit of the Japanese 5th Division, the 21st Brigade, which had also participated in the Russo-Japanese War, nicknamed the "unbreakable sword".  Faced with the serious possibility of being completely cut off, the Japanese army ended up relying on air power for the delivery of vital supplies. Before Major General Nakamura's death, he admitted in his diary that the Chinese soldiers' fighting ability had surpassed the Russians whom the Brigade encountered in Manchuria. This campaign was the first major victory of the Chinese army since the Battle of Wuhan. At a cost of 14,000 casualties, the Chinese army had inflicted a total of 10,000 casualties on the Japanese. Among the Japanese casualties were 5,000 fatalities, including over 85% of all officers, such as Major General Nakamura, Colonel Sakata Gen'ichi (commander of the 42nd Regiment and acting commander of the 21st Brigade), Colonel Miki Kichinosuke (commander of the 21st Regiment), Colonel 生田滕一 (deputy commander of the 21st Regiment), 杵平作 (commander of the 1st Battalion), 官本得 (commander of the 2nd Battalion), 森本宮 (commander of the 3rd Battalion), among others. Additionally, the Chinese took 102 Japanese troops as prisoner, and captured 79 horses, 10 mountain guns, 12 field guns, 10 anti-tank guns, 102 light machine guns, 80 heavy machine guns, and 2,000 rifles.

Orders of battle

Chinese
5th Corps
200th Division - Commander Dai Anlan
1st Honor Division
New 22nd Division

Japanese
21st Brigade / 5th Division
21st Infantry Regiment
42nd Infantry Regiment
Cavalry Regiment / 5th Division
5th Artillery Regiment / 5th Division
Two Regiments / Taiwan Mixed Brigade

Notes

References
Hsu Long-hsuen and Chang Ming-kai, History of The Sino-Japanese War (1937–1945) 2nd Ed., 1971. Translated by Wen Ha-hsiung, Chung Wu Publishing; 33, 140th Lane, Tung-hwa Street, Taipei, Taiwan Republic of China. Pg. 311-318, Pg. 325-327,
Perry–Castañeda Library Map Collection, China 1:250,000, Series L500, U.S. Army Map Service, 1954- . Topographic Maps of China during the Second World War.
Bibliography

 Cheung, Raymond. OSPREY AIRCRAFT OF THE ACES 126: Aces of the Republic of China Air Force. Oxford: Bloomsbury Publishing Plc, 2015. .
 徐 (Xú), 露梅 (Lùméi). 隕落 (Fallen): 682位空军英烈的生死档案 - 抗战空军英烈档案大解密 (A Decryption of 682 Air Force Heroes of The War of Resistance-WWII and Their Martyrdom). 东城区, 北京， 中国: 团结出版社, 2016. .

External links

Topographic maps
Lai-pin NF49-1
Nanning NF49-5

Conflicts in 1939
Conflicts in 1940
1939 in China
1940 in China
K
1939 in Japan
1940 in Japan
Military history of Guangxi
December 1939 events
January 1940 events